The Bath Covered Bridge is a historic covered bridge over the Ammonoosuc River off US 302 and NH 10 in Bath, New Hampshire. Built in 1832, it is one of the state's oldest surviving covered bridges. It was listed on the National Register of Historic Places in 1976, and underwent a major rehabilitation in the 2010s.

Description and history
The Bath Covered Bridge is located on the west side of the village center of Bath, carrying West Bath Road over the Ammonoosuc River. The bridge consists of four spans supported by Burr trusses, resting on stone piers and abutments, and is finished with vertical board siding. When originally built, it had only three spans, but when the bridge was raised in the 1920s, a third pier was added, as were laminated arches to strengthen the bridge.

The bridge is the fifth to stand on this site, where a bridge has stood since at least 1794. That bridge was washed away by flooding in 1806, as were subsequent bridges in 1820 and 1826. The fourth bridge was destroyed by fire in 1830. The bridge serves a primarily rural residential population, and sees relatively little traffic. The bridge was closed to traffic in October 2012 for safety, structural, and cosmetic reasons. After 21 months and $3 million in repairs, it re-opened in August 2014.

See also

List of bridges documented by the Historic American Engineering Record in New Hampshire
List of bridges on the National Register of Historic Places in New Hampshire
List of covered bridges in New Hampshire
National Register of Historic Places listings in Grafton County, New Hampshire

References

External links

Bath Covered Bridge on Flickr

Covered bridges on the National Register of Historic Places in New Hampshire
Bridges completed in 1832
Bridges in Grafton County, New Hampshire
Tourist attractions in Grafton County, New Hampshire
Historic American Engineering Record in New Hampshire
National Register of Historic Places in Grafton County, New Hampshire
Road bridges on the National Register of Historic Places in New Hampshire
Wooden bridges in New Hampshire
Burr Truss bridges in the United States
1832 establishments in New Hampshire
Bath, New Hampshire